D'sean Theobalds (born 21 October 1995) is an English professional footballer who plays as a midfielder for Concord Rangers.

Career
Theobalds joined Tonbridge Angels from Leatherhead in December 2018, having previously played for Redbridge and Barkingside. He went on to make 44 league appearances for the club, helping them achieve promotion to National League South in his first season. On 6 February, he joined Ekstraklasa side Korona Kielce on a three-and-a-half year deal. On 16 February 2020, he made his professional debut, starting and playing 62 minutes in the 0–0 draw with Jagiellonia Białystok.

On 5 August 2020, Theobalds left Korona Kielce by mutual consent after making two appearances for the club. A month later he returned to his previous club, Tonbridge Angels.

On 18 March 2021, Theobalds returned to Poland to join fourth-tier side, Unia Tarnów.

After six first-team appearances for Dartford in all competitions, Theobalds joined Welling United until the end of the 2021-22 season. On 18 March 2022, Welling United announced that Theobalds had left the club along with four other players.

On 23 March 2022, Theobalds signed for Isthmian League Premier Division side Kingstonian.

Career statistics

Honours

Tonbridge Angels:
Ryman Premier League Super Play-off final winners (2018-19)

References

External links

D'sean Theobalds at Aylesbury United

Living people
1995 births
Footballers from Greater London
Association football midfielders
Redbridge F.C. players
Barkingside F.C. players
Leatherhead F.C. players
Concord Rangers F.C. players
Tonbridge Angels F.C. players
Korona Kielce players
Unia Tarnów players
Dartford F.C. players
Welling United F.C. players
Kingstonian F.C. players
English footballers
Ekstraklasa players
English expatriate footballers
English expatriate sportspeople in Poland
Expatriate footballers in Poland
Isthmian League players
Essex Senior Football League players
National League (English football) players
Black British sportspeople